Vice-provincial or a vice-provincial may refer to

 A vice-provincial superior, an assistant to a Jesuit provincial superior
 A vice-provincial city in the People's Republic of China

See also
 Provincial (disambiguation)